The 1:12 scale is a traditional scale (ratio) for models and miniatures. In this scale (ratio), one inch on the scale model or miniature is equal to twelve inches on the original object being copied. Depending on the application, this particular scale (ratio) is also called one-scale (since 1 inch equals 1 foot).

The scale is popular for dollhouses, especially those aimed at adult collectors.  It is also used for model live steam railroads, and rather rarely, for high-end die-cast model  and radio-controlled cars.

1:12 scale is also popular for action figures and related toys, especially those based on super-heroes and related concepts (such as Marvel Legends, DC Universe Classics and most recently Mezco Toyz's One:12 series.) It has also been used for at least one related game (Shadowrun Duels).

The 1:12 scale was also used in Jonathan Swift's 1726 novel Gulliver's Travels. The ratio was used to compare the Lilliputians to Gulliver.

See also
 List of scale model sizes

References

Scale model scales
Toy cars and trucks
Dollhouses